The Wawa River is a river located in Caraga, in northeastern Mindanao, in the southern Philippine island. Its headwaters traverse the municipality of Sibagat, Bayugan, and Esperanza (all of the province of Agusan del Sur). The Wawa River is a tributary of the larger Agusan River.

Etymology

Wawa came from the Dumagat term that means an "entrance" or "passage". The river was once used by early settlers as a means of transportation during the early years.

Geography

The river originates at the Diwata Mountain Range of the northeastern hinterlands of Sibagat in barangays Kolambugan and Padiay and streams traversing the riverbank barangays of Perez, Banagbanag, Santa Cruz, Magsaysay, San Isidro I, Villangit, Poblacion, Tag-uyango, San Vicente, Ilihan (all in the municipality of Sibagat), and barangays Del Carmen (formerly Wawa), Mabuhay, Canayugan, San Agustin, Sagmone, Noli, Maygatasan, Verdu, Salvacion (all in the City of Bayugan) and Mahagkot, Crossing Luna, Dakutan, Bentahon, Piglawigan (all in the municipality of Esperanza) wherein its mouth joins with the larger Agusan River located in Barangay Poblacion, Esperanza, Agusan del Sur.

Crossings

There are three permanent bridges that cross the Wawa River:
 Wawa Bridge (1) – the longest steel bridge in the province located in Barangay San Vicente, Sibagat, Agusan del Sur along the Pan Philippine Highway Butuan-Davao Road, connecting the road linking the Municipality of Sibagat and City of Bayugan
 Wawa Bridge (2) – located in Barangay Padiay, Sibagat, along the Butuan-Tandag Road, connecting the road linking Brgy. Kolambugan and Brgy. Padiay in the town of Sibagat
 Esperanza Bridge – the longest duck girder bridge in the province located in Barangay Poblacion, Esperanza, Agusan del Sur connecting the road linking NRJ-Bayugan-Esperanza Road and Esperanza town proper

Tributaries 

 Managong River – Barangay Padiay, Sibagat, Agusan del Sur
 Palacio River – Barangay Perez, Sibagat, Agusan del Sur
 Balangubang River – Barangay Sta. Cruz, Sibagat, Agusan del Sur
 Boguko River – Barangay Magsaysay, Sibagat, Agusan del Sur
 Ponhikon River – Barangay Villangit, Sibagat, Agusan del Sur
 Sibagat River – Barangay Poblacion, Sibagat, Agusan del Sur
 Andanan River – Barangay Maygatasan, Bayugan

Covered areas

Sibagat, Agusan del Sur
Bayugan, Agusan del Sur
Esperanza, Agusan del Sur

See also

Agusan River
Sibagat River
Boguko River
Andanan River
Tambagoko River
Sibagat, Agusan del Sur
Bayugan, Agusan del Sur
Esperanza, Agusan del Sur
Agusan del Sur Province
List of rivers of the Philippines

References

Rivers of the Philippines
Geography of Agusan del Sur
Landforms of Agusan del Sur